Léboka Airport  is an airstrip serving the town of Mounana in Haut-Ogooué Province, Gabon.

See also

 List of airports in Gabon
 Transport in Gabon

References

External links
HERE/Nokia - Léboka

Airports in Gabon